Peter Ronan (1911 – after 1932) was a Scottish professional footballer. He joined Cardiff City in 1931 as a replacement for Billy Hardy but was released after one season. He instead returned to Scotland where he later played for East Fife.

References

1911 births
Date of death missing
Scottish footballers
Cardiff City F.C. players
East Fife F.C. players
English Football League players
Association football wing halves